Rico Lieder (born 25 September 1971 in Burgstädt, East Germany) is a retired German sprinter who specialized in the 400 metres.

He competed for the clubs SC Karl-Marx-Stadt, LG Chemnitz and LAC Chemnitz during his active career.

Achievements

References

1971 births
Living people
People from Burgstädt
People from Bezirk Karl-Marx-Stadt
German male sprinters
Sportspeople from Saxony
Olympic athletes of Germany
Athletes (track and field) at the 1992 Summer Olympics
Athletes (track and field) at the 1996 Summer Olympics
World Athletics Championships medalists
European Athletics Championships medalists
World Athletics Indoor Championships winners